2004 Meistriliiga was the 14th season of the Meistriliiga, Estonia's premier football league. Levadia won their third title.

Season overview
Levadia Tallinn won their third title with a six-point advantage over the runners-up TVMK Tallinn. Tammeka Tartu and Tervis Pärnu won promotion to the Meistriliiga as the Esiliiga champions and third placed team respectively, the runners-up Levadia Tallinn II were ineligible for promotion. Expansion of the league to ten teams from eight, for the upcoming season, also ensured that even the last placed Lootus Alutaguse had a chance to stay in the top flight, but were defeated by Esiliiga's fourth team Dünamo Tallinn, winning the away leg 2-1, but then losing at home 0-4 a week later. Tervis Pärnu were later denied the Meistriliiga license, sealing an unlikely promotion for the fifth-placed FC Kuressaare.

League table

Relegation play-off

Tallinna Dünamo won 5-2 on aggregate and were promoted for the 2005 Meistriliiga. Alutaguse Lootus were relegated to the 2005 Esiliiga.

Results
Each team played every opponent four times, twice at home and twice on the road, for a total of 36 games.

First half of season

Second half of season

Top scorers

See also
 2003–04 Estonian Cup
 2004–05 Estonian Cup
 2004 Esiliiga

References

External links
 

Meistriliiga seasons
1
Estonia
Estonia